Pain Velayat Rural District is a rural district (dehestan) in the Central District of Kashmar County, Razavi Khorasan province, Iran. At the 2006 census, its population was 11,399, in 3,144 families.  The rural district has 18 villages.

References 

Rural Districts of Razavi Khorasan Province
Kashmar County